Khaled Al-Hanaai (born 5 November 1997), is a Qatari professional footballer who plays as a midfielder.

Career statistics

Club

References

External links

1997 births
Living people
Qatari footballers
Association football midfielders
Al Kharaitiyat SC players
Al-Markhiya SC players
Al-Shahania SC players
Muaither SC players
Qatar Stars League players
Qatari Second Division players